Aleksander Mahlberg (1897 – 1937 Soviet Union) was an Estonian politician. He was a member of II Riigikogu. On 7 June 1923, he resigned his position and he was replaced by Johannes Lauristin.

References

1897 births
1937 deaths
Workers' United Front politicians
Members of the Riigikogu, 1923–1926
Estonian emigrants to the Soviet Union
Great Purge victims from Estonia